
Lapathus (Lápathos), also recorded as Lapethus (Lápēthos), Lepethis (Lēpēthís), and Lapithus (Lápithos), was an ancient Cypriot town near present-day Lampousa and Karavas.

History
The foundation of Lapathus was credited to the Phoenicians. Nonnus claimed the name derived from an eponymous Lapathus, a follower of Dionysus. Strabo said that it received a Spartan colony headed by Praxander. He adds that it was situated opposite to the town of Nagidus in Cilicia and possessed a harbour and docks. It was situated in the north of the island, on a river of the same name and in a district called Lapethia (Lapēthía).

In the war between Ptolemy and Antigonus, Lapathus and its king Praxippus sided with the latter. The name of the place became synonymous with stupidity.

References

Citations

Bibliography
 . 
 

Populated places in ancient Cyprus
Cities in ancient Cyprus
Phoenician colonies in Cyprus
Spartan colonies
Former populated places in Cyprus